Bowne is a surname. Notable people with the surname include:
 Alan Bowne (1945–1989), American playwright and author
 Andrew Bowne (c. 1638–c. 1708), American colonial politician
Borden Parker Bowne (1847–1910), theologian associated with American Methodism
 John Bowne (1627–1695), English colonist in North America
 Norwood Bowne (1813–1890), New York newspaper editor and politician
 Obadiah Bowne (1822–1874), American politician from New York
Peter Bowne (1575–c. 1624), English physician
 Samuel S. Bowne (1800–1865), American politician from New York
 Walter Bowne (1770–1846), 59th Mayor of New York City

See also
 Bown (surname)
 Bownes
 Bowen (surname)
 Bowens (surname)